Klaus and Eva Herlitz (died 26 February 2021) were a German married couple and businesspeople living in Berlin. They developed United Buddy Bears, "an international symbol of collaboration among nations of what can be achieved when we work together toward a better tomorrow".

On 1 October 2013, Eva and Klaus Herlitz received the Verdienstorden des Landes Berlin (Merit of the State of Berlin), for outstanding service to the state. For outstanding social engagement Eva and Klaus Herlitz received the Bundesverdienstkreuz (Order of Merit of the Federal Republic of Germany) medal on 17 January 2019.

Publications 
 Herlitz, Eva and Klaus, Buddy Bear Berlin Show. NeptunArt Publisher, 2001. 
 Herlitz, Eva and Klaus, United Buddy Bears - Die Kunst der Toleranz. Bostelmann & Siebenhaar Publishers, 2003. 
 Herlitz, Eva and Klaus, United Buddy Bears - World Tour. NeptunArt Publisher, 2006. 
 Herlitz, Eva and Klaus: United Buddy Bears - The Art of Tolerance, 384 pages, English/German, 2009, .
 Herlitz, Eva and Klaus: Buddy Bear Berlin, 4th edition, December 2015, .
 Herlitz, Eva and Klaus: United Buddy Bears – The Art of Tolerance on World Tour, 288 pages, English/German, 2017, .
 Herlitz, Klaus: Die Buddy Bären und der schneeweisse Elefant, a German children's book, illustrated by Manon Kahle. December 2010, .
 Herlitz, Eva: Buddy Bear Colouring Book, colouring book, illustrated by Anja Boje, 16 pages. May 2011, .

Buddy Bears

Buddy Bears began as a street art event in Berlin, started by Klaus and Eva Herlitz in 2001. Hundreds of bears were created and displayed in the city that year. There were bears on all fours, on two legs, standing on their heads and sitting down. These bears have gone on tour around the world in Shanghai, Buenos Aires and St Gallen, Switzerland.

United Buddy Bears
In Berlin 2002, the idea was born to motivate as many countries acknowledged by the United Nations as possible to select an artist - with the result that as of today, more than 148 artists have designed a large, -tall Buddy Bear. Each bear is an artistic expression of the individual country. These bears are placed next to each other in a large circle - generally in alphabetical order - as a unique synthesis of the arts.

One important prerequisite for this international unifying project is to choose artists from the individual countries - for the circle to reflect the diversity of the cultures of "one world". The observer learns about the culture, the history, the people and the landscape of the individual countries - large or small. Hence the United Buddy Bears circle has become a
platform for even the smallest and poorest countries which frequently remain unnoticed. Suddenly, they are equal to larger and often rich nations.

The circle - representing The Art of Tolerance with its symbolism of love, peace and friendship - has been presented on all five continents in over 30 metropolises of this world - always in the very heart of the cities. The bears have been displayed at the following Stations since the beginning of the tour in 2002: Berlin (Germany), Kitzbuehel (Austria), Hong Kong, Istanbul (Turkey), Tokyo (Japan), Seoul (South Korea), Sydney (Australia), Vienna (Austria), Cairo (Egypt), Jerusalem (Israel), Warsaw (Poland), Stuttgart (Germany), Pyongyang (North Korea), Buenos Aires (Argentina), Montevideo (Uruguay), Astana (Kazakhstan), Helsinki (Finland), Sofia (Bulgaria), Kuala Lumpur (Malaysia), New Delhi (India), Saint Petersburg (Russia), Paris (France), Rio de Janeiro (Brazil), Havana (Cuba), Santiago de Chile (Chile), Riga (Latvia).

Admission to the exhibition is always free of charge. The number of visitors has often exceeded 1 million. 
 
As soon as a country decides to commission a new Buddy Bear, the predecessor is sold at an auction in aid of UNICEF or other child relief organizations all over the world. So far, over EUR 2,400,000 (since 2002 till 2019) have been raised at auctions in various cities of the world.

Eva Herlitz, together with several international artists, founded in Berlin in 2004 Buddy Bear Help, a children's charity which guarantees that 100 percent of received donations and auction revenues from charity activities will be used for the selected children's projects. Furthermore, all administrative costs are borne by the club members.

References

External links 

 Official Homepage of United Buddy Bears
 The Golden Buddy Bears
 Colorful bear statues representing UN member states on display in Rio de Janeiro
 IANSlive: "Germany sends peace message through sculptures in Cuba"
 Santiago de Chile 2015

Married couples
German artists
2021 deaths
Businesspeople from Berlin
1947 births
1952 births
Recipients of the Cross of the Order of Merit of the Federal Republic of Germany
Recipients of the Order of Merit of Berlin

de:Klaus Herlitz